Middle Sister is a mountain in the Sweetwater Mountains of Mono County, California, United States. It is located within the Humboldt-Toiyabe National Forest.

References 

Mountains of Mono County, California
Landforms of Lyon County, Nevada
Mountains of Northern California